Rani Nokrani is a Pakistani television drama series aired on Express Entertainment for 2019 television season. It is produced by Shanzay Ali of TS Media in collaboration with Syed Mukhtar of Gold Bridge Media, written by Muhammad Asif, directed by Syed Faisal Bukhari and features Kinza Hashmi, Imran Ashraf, Farhan    Malhi and Amna Malick in lead roles.

Cast
Kinza Hashmi as Hina: a kind and caring girl, Asad and Shazia's daughter.
Imran Ashraf as Abdullah: a vehicle mechanic by profession from a poor family, Samina's brother.
Farhan Ahmed Malhi as Fareed: Hina's cousin, Aisha's son.
Aamna Malick as Samina: Abdullah's sister.
Firdous Jamal as Asad: Hina's father, Shazia's husband.
Seemi Pasha as Shazia: a social worker, Hina's mother.
Laila Wasti as Aisha: a social and NGO worker, Shazia's friend, Fareed's mother.
Asma Abbas as Shano Bee: a maid working for Shazia and her family, Abdullah and Samina's mother.
Durdana Butt as Parveen: Asad's mother, Hina's grandmother.
Parveen Akbar as Nani: Shano's mother, Abdullah and Samina's maternal grandmother.
Mukhtar Ahmed as Zeerak: Shazia's elite cousin brother, came from Bahrain.
Shahid Sheikh as Ustad Babban: Abdullah's boss at mechanic workshop.
Aiman Zaman as Maria: Fareed's girlfriend, Zeerak's accomplice .

References

2019 Pakistani television series debuts
Pakistani television series